The Pentecostal Mission (TPM) or New Testament Church (NTC) in the United States or Universal Pentecostal Church (UPC) in the United Kingdom is a Pentecostal denomination which was founded in Colombo, Ceylon (now Sri Lanka) in 1923. The international headquarters is now situated in Irumbuliyur, Chennai, Tamil Nadu, India. There are over 37 million members across the world. It now has churches in over 65 countries operating under various names. It was before known as Ceylon Pentecostal Mission (CPM).

History 
The church was founded by Pastor Paul Ramankutty, who was born to Hindu parents in the district of Trichur in Kerala, India. While in Sri Lanka, at the age of 18, he became a Christian. Later, he felt a strong call and began to preach and share the gospel in various parts of Kerala, Tamil Nadu, and Sri Lanka, working with other evangelists.  In 1923 he founded the church with the name Ceylon Pentecostal Mission, later changed to The Pentecostal Mission.

School 
The congregation in Sri Lanka operates a school for secular studies known as C.P.M Faith School in Wattala in Columbo.

Church leadership 

The church is led by a Chief Pastor (currently Abraham Mathew). In addition, there is a Deputy Chief Pastor (currently M.T. Thomas) and an Associate Deputy Chief Pastor (currently G. Jeyam).

In the United States most of the church work was pioneered by the late Don M Spiers, who had previously worked closely with Oral Roberts. Gregg Wilson now heads the work in USA and countries around the USA. He is assisted by the sister-in-charge Lisa Billow.

Full-time ministers are expected to practice an ascetic lifestyle including celibacy, obedience to the elder pastors, communal living (including disposal of private possessions) in faith homes.
TPM churches are run by full-time ministers who are celibate and predominantly single. Married couples who enter full-time ministry can become celibate and may be sent to different locations by the TPM leadership if they so choose.

Doctrines and teachings 
The doctrines of the church broadly align with trinitarian Pentecostalism.

However there are a few unique principles 
1. Celibacy 
2. Divine Healing 
3. Tent life

Magazine ministry
Magazines are produced in several languages. The English language magazine published from India is called The Voice of Pentecost. Pilgrim's Journal is published and printed in the USA. Other English language magazines are Pentecostal Messenger from Malaysia, The Youth Herald from Singapore, Power Divine from Sri Lanka, and Trumpet of the Lord from the UK.

Church Magazines are being published in more than forty Indian languages and other foreign languages. Malayalam magazine Pentecost is one of the oldest Pentecostal magazines from Kerala. A Hindi edition Pentecost Ki Wani published from New Delhi, Tamil edition named Pentecosthin Peroli from Irumbilyur (Chennai), Pentecost-Chi Vaani from Mumbai, and Pentecost Da Sneha from Dhariwal (Punjab) are also produced.

See also
 Christianity in Sri Lanka

References

Pentecostal denominations in Asia
Pentecostalism in India
Christian organizations established in 1923
1923 establishments in Ceylon